The following is the 1976–77 network television schedule for the three major English language commercial broadcast networks in the United States. The schedule covers primetime hours from September 1976 through August 1977. The schedule is followed by a list per network of returning series, new series, and series cancelled after the 1975–76 season. All times are Eastern and Pacific, with certain exceptions, such as Monday Night Football.

New fall series are highlighted in bold.

Each of the 30 highest-rated shows is listed with its rank and rating as determined by Nielsen Media Research.

 Yellow indicates the programs in the top 10 for the season.
 Cyan indicates the programs in the top 20 for the season.
 Magenta indicates the programs in the top 30 for the season.

PBS, the Public Broadcasting Service, was in operation, but the schedule was set by each local station.

The Muppet Show (syndicated in the U.S.) premiered this season.

Sunday

Monday 

Note: The Brady Bunch Hour previously aired on a sporadic basis starting in November 1976, before becoming a weekly series in February 1977.

Tuesday 

Note: On ABC, the 1977 summer miniseries Rich Man, Poor Man consisted of reruns of the 1976 miniseries. On CBS, The Family Holvak consisted of reruns of the 1975 NBC series before being replaced by a four-week run of The Jack Benny Show (with Phyllis in the 8:30 slot), featuring episodes from its 1963-64 season.

Wednesday

Thursday 

Note: NBC was supposed to have aired Snip (a sitcom starring David Brenner) on Thursdays at 9:30-10 with The Practice preceding it in the 9-9:30 slot, but Snip never aired. On August 28, NBC did a "massive reshuffling" of its schedule and pulled the series.

Friday 

Note: A special program, Campaign '76, aired on CBS from 7:30 to 8:00 p.m. from September to early November in preparation for the 1976 presidential election.

Saturday

By network

ABC

Returning Series
The ABC Sunday Night Movie
ABC NFL Monday Night Football
Baretta
Barney Miller
The Bionic Woman
Donny & Marie
Family
Happy Days
Laverne & Shirley
Monday Night Baseball
Starsky & Hutch
The Six Million Dollar Man
The Streets of San Francisco
Welcome Back, Kotter

New Series
Blansky's Beauties *
The Brady Bunch Hour *
The Captain and Tennille
Charlie's Angels
Cos
Dog and Cat *
Eight Is Enough *
The Feather and Father Gang *
Fish *
Future Cop *
The Hardy Boys/Nancy Drew Mysteries *
Holmes & Yoyo
How the West Was Won *
Mr. T and Tina
Most Wanted
The Nancy Walker Show
Rich Man, Poor Man Book II
Sugar Time!
Three's Company *
The Tony Randall Show
Westside Medical *
What's Happening!!
Wonder Woman *

Not returning from 1975–76:
Almost Anything Goes
Barbary Coast
Bert D'Angelo/Superstar
Good Heavens
Harry O
Marcus Welby, M.D.
Matt Helm
Mobile One
On the Rocks
Rich Man, Poor Man
The Rookies
Saturday Night Live with Howard Cosell
S.W.A.T.
The Swiss Family Robinson
That's My Mama
When Things Were Rotten
Viva Valdez

CBS

Returning Series
60 Minutes
All in the Family
Barnaby Jones
The Blue Knight
The Bob Newhart Show
The Carol Burnett Show
Doc
Good Times
Hawaii Five-O
The Jacksons
The Jeffersons
Kojak
M*A*S*H
The Mary Tyler Moore Show
Maude
One Day at a Time
Phyllis
Rhoda
The Sonny and Cher Show
Switch
The Tony Orlando and Dawn Rainbow Hour
The Waltons

New Series
Alice
All's Fair
The Andros Targets *
Ball Four
Busting Loose *
Code R *
Delvecchio
The Diahann Carroll Show *
Executive Suite
Hunter *
The Keane Brothers Show *
Loves Me, Loves Me Not *
The Marilyn McCoo and Billy Davis, Jr. Show
Nashville 99 *
The Shields and Yarnell Show *
Spencer's Pilots
Starland Vocal Band Show *
Szysznyk *
Who's Who *
A Year at the Top *

Not returning from 1975–76:
Beacon Hill
Big Eddie
Bronk
The Bugs Bunny/Road Runner Show
Cannon
CBS Thursday Night Movie
Cher
Ivan the Terrible
I've Got a Secret
Joe and Sons
Johnny Cash and Friends
Kate McShane
The Kelly Monteith Show
Medical Center
Popi
Sara
Three for the Road

NBC

Returning Series
Chico and the Man
Columbo
Emergency!
Little House on the Prairie
McCloud
McMillan & Wife
The NBC Sunday Mystery Movie
NBC Monday Night at the Movies
NBC Saturday Night at the Movies
Police Story
Police Woman
The Practice
The Rockford Files
Sanford and Son
The Wonderful World of Disney

New Series
3 Girls 3 *
Baa Baa Black Sheep
The Big Event
C.P.O. Sharkey *
The Fantastic Journey *
Gemini Man
Gibbsville *
The Kallikaks *
Kingston: Confidential *
Lanigan's Rabbi *
The Life and Times of Grizzly Adams *
The McLean Stevenson Show *
NBC's Best Sellers *
The Quest
Quincy, M.E. *
Quinn Martin's Tales of the Unexpected *
Serpico
Sirota's Court *
Van Dyke and Company

Not returning from 1975–76:
City of Angels
The Cop and the Kid
Doctors' Hospital
The Dumplings
Ellery Queen
The Family Holvak
Fay
Grady
The Invisible Man
Jigsaw John
Joe Forrester
The John Davidson Show
The Mac Davis Show
McCoy
Medical Story
The Montefuscos
Movin' On
Petrocelli
The Rich Little Show

Note: The * indicates that the program was introduced in midseason.

References

Additional sources
 Castleman, H. & Podrazik, W. (1982). Watching TV: Four Decades of American Television. New York: McGraw-Hill. 314 pp.
 McNeil, Alex. Total Television. Fourth edition. New York: Penguin Books. .
 Brooks, Tim & Marsh, Earle (1985). The Complete Directory to Prime Time Network TV Shows (3rd ed.). New York: Ballantine. .

United States primetime network television schedules
1976 in American television
1977 in American television